The Danish language has a number of regional and local dialect varieties. These can be divided into the traditional dialects, which differ from modern Standard Danish in both phonology and grammar, and the Danish accents, which are local varieties of the standard language distinguished mostly by pronunciation and local vocabulary colored by traditional dialects. Traditional dialects are now mostly extinct in Denmark, with only the oldest generations still speaking them. 

The traditional dialects are generally divided into three main dialectal areas: Jutlandic dialect, Insular Danish, and East Danish. Since the Swedish conquest of the Eastern Danish provinces Skåne, Halland and Blekinge in 1645/1658, the Eastern Danish dialects there have come under heavy Swedish influence. Many residents now speak regional variants of Standard Swedish. However, many researchers still consider the dialects in Scania, Halland and Blekinge as part of the East Danish dialect group. The Swedish National Encyclopedia from 1995 classifies Scanian as an Eastern Danish dialect with South Swedish elements. Also Bornholmish belongs to the East Danish dialect group. Jutlandic is divided into Southern Jutlandic and Northern Jutlandic, with Northern Jutlandic subdivided into North Jutlandic and West Jutlandic. Insular Danish is divided into Zealand, Funen, and Lolland-Falster dialect areas – each with additional internal variation. The variant of Standard Danish spoken in Southern Schleswig is called South Schleswig Danish, the Danish variant on the Faroe Islands Gøtudanskt. Danish shares many similarities with the Norwegian (Bokmål). Also North Frisian and Gutnish (Gutamål) are influenced by Danish.

and tonal accents

The realization of  has traditionally been one of the most important isoglosses for classifying geographic dialect areas. There are four main regional variants of :

South of a line ( 'the  boundary') going through central South Jutland and crossing Southern Funen and central Langeland and north of Lolland-Falster, Southern Zealand, and Bornholm, there is neither  nor pitch accent.
In Zealandic traditional dialects and regional language,  is more frequent than in the standard language.

On Zealand, some traditional dialects have a phenomenon called short-vowel : some monosyllabic words with a short vowel and a coda consonant cluster have  when the definite suffix follows:   'priest' but   'the priest'.

In Western Jutland, a second , more like a preconsonantal glottal stop, occurs in addition to the one of Standard Danish. It occurs in different environments, particularly after stressed vowels before final consonant clusters that arise through the elision of final unstressed vowels. For example, the word  'to pull', which is /trække/ in Standard Danish, is [tʁæʔk] in Western Jutlandic. Also, the present tense , which is /trækker/ in Standard Danish, is [tʁæʔkə] in Western Jutlandic.

References

Bibliography